AppsFlyer is a SaaS mobile marketing analytics and attribution platform, headquartered in San Francisco, California.

History
AppsFlyer is a privately held company founded in 2011 by Oren Kaniel, its current CEO, and CTO Reshef Mann. AppsFlyer received its first funding from the Microsoft Ventures Accelerator program.

Following the Microsoft Ventures Accelerator, AppsFlyer raised Series A funding from Pitango and Magma partners. 

In January 2015, AppsFlyer announced that it had raised $20 million in Series B funding from Fidelity Growth Partners Europe, which has helped accelerate the company’s growth. Following 2 years of development, AppsFlyer announced on 17 January 2017 that it had raised an additional $56 million in Series C financing, bringing its total funding to $84 million. The round was led by new investors Qumra Capital, as well as Goldman Sachs Private Capital Investing (PCI), Deutsche Telekom Capital Partners (DTCP) and Pitango Growth.

In February 2018, AppsFlyer opened a new US headquarters in San Francisco.

In May 2018, AppsFlyer acquired the development team Yodas.

In January 2020 AppsFlyer announced a $210 million series D funding round at a company valuation of $1.6 billion. The round was led by growth equity firm General Atlantic.

References

External links
 AppsFlyer

Mobile technology companies
2011 establishments in California
Marketing companies established in 2011
Companies based in San Francisco
Marketing companies of the United States